Montezuma is an unincorporated community in Avery County, North Carolina, United States. Before its founding in 1883, it had two variant names, Aaron and Bull Scrape.  The community is located on Old State Highway 181 and is on the Eastern Continental Divide.

History
Between 1904 and 1940, Montezuma was a stop along the East Tennessee and Western North Carolina Railroad between Newland and Linville, with a spur to Pineola.

References

Unincorporated communities in Avery County, North Carolina
Unincorporated communities in North Carolina
Populated places established in 1883